WTXX-LD, virtual channel 34 (UHF digital channel 29), is a low-powered Timeless TV-owned-and-operated  television station licensed to Springfield, Massachusetts, United States. The station is owned by HC2 Holdings. The station's transmitter is located in Hamden, Connecticut. WTXX is the former call sign of The CW affiliate WCCT-TV.

History
In June 2013, former owner R and S Broadcasting reached a deal to sell WTXX-LP, along with sister station WRNT-LP in Hartford, Connecticut, to Landover 5 LLC. However, the deal eventually fell through, and both stations were instead sold to Tyche Broadcasting, later renamed Tyche Media.

In 2016, WTXX-LP was moved from Springfield, Massachusetts to West Hartford, Connecticut and went on the air before moving again in April 2017, to New Haven on Channel 34. However, top-of-the-hour bumpers still mention it as a Springfield station to this day. WTXX-LD was an affiliate of IntrigueTV.

In January 2018, Tyche Media reached a deal to sell WTXX-LD and WRNT-LD to HC2 Holdings for $2.325 million.

After Azteca America signed off the air on January 1, 2023, today WTXX-LD became a Timeless TV affiliate which it is still owned and operated by HC2 Holdings.

Digital channels
The station's digital signal is multiplexed:

References

External links

Innovate Corp.
TXX-LD
Television channels and stations established in 1992
1992 establishments in Massachusetts
Low-power television stations in the United States